Fauvillers is a municipality of Wallonia located in the province of Luxembourg, Belgium. 

On 1 January 2007 the municipality, which covers 74.11 km², had 2,071 inhabitants, giving a population density of 27.9 inhabitants per km².

The municipality consists of the following districts: Fauvillers, Hollange, and Tintange. Other population centers include:
 Bodange
 Burnon
 Honville
 Hotte
 Malmaison
 Menufontaine
 Sainlez
 Strainchamps
 Warnach
 Wisembach

References

External links
 

 
Municipalities of Luxembourg (Belgium)